The United States District Court for the Eastern District of North Carolina (in case citations, E.D.N.C.) is the United States district court that serves the eastern 44 counties in North Carolina. Appeals from the Eastern District of North Carolina are taken to the United States Court of Appeals for the Fourth Circuit (except for patent claims and claims against the U.S. government under the Tucker Act, which are appealed to the Federal Circuit).

Jurisdiction and offices 
The District has three staffed offices and holds court in six cities: Elizabeth City, Fayetteville, Greenville, New Bern, Raleigh, and Wilmington. Its main office is in Raleigh. It is broken down into four divisions. The eastern division is headquartered in Greenville and handles cases from Beaufort, Carteret, Craven, Edgecombe, Greene, Halifax, Hyde, Jones, Lenoir, Martin, Pamlico, and Pitt counties.

The southern division is based in Wilmington and serves the counties of: Bladen, Brunswick, Columbus, Duplin, New Hanover, Onslow, Pender, Robeson, and Sampson. Its cases are heard in Wilmington.

The northern and western divisions are based in Raleigh. The western covers: Cumberland, Franklin, Granville, Harnett, Johnston, Nash, Vance, Wake, Warren, Wayne, and Wilson counties. Its cases are heard in Fayetteville, Greenville, and New Bern. The northern division presides over cases from: Bertie, Camden, Chowan, Currituck, Dare, Gates, Hertford, Northampton, Pasquotank, Perquimans, Tyrrell and Washington counties. Its cases are heard in Elizabeth City.

Pleadings are accepted for all divisions in any of the offices in Raleigh, Greenville, New Bern, or Wilmington.

History 

In both instances, these districts, unlike those with geographic designations that existed in other states, were titled by the names of the cities in which the courts sat. After the first division, they were styled the District of Edenton, the District of New Bern, and the District of Wilmington; after the second division, they were styled the District of Albemarle, the District of Cape Fear, and the District of Pamptico. However, in both instances, only one judge was authorized to serve all three districts, causing them to effectively operate as a single district. The latter combination was occasionally referred to by the cumbersome title of the United States District Court for the Albemarle, Cape Fear & Pamptico Districts of North Carolina.

The presiding judge of the District of North Carolina, George Washington Brooks, was then reassigned to preside over only the Eastern District.

On July 6, 2021, under , Hoke, Moore, Scotland, and Richmond counties were transferred into the Eastern District from the Western District to end the previous situation where Fort Bragg was covered by two different districts.

Current judges 
:

Former judges

Chief judges

Succession of seats

U.S. Attorneys for the Eastern District 
 Richard C. Badger (1872–1878)
 J. W. Albertson (1878–1882)
 W. S. O. Robinson (1882–1885)
 Fabius H. Busbee (1885–1889)
 Charles A. Cooke (1889–1893)
 Charles B. Aycock (1893–1898)
 Claude M. Bernard (1898–1902)
 Harry Skinner (1902–1910)
 Herbert F. Seawell (1910–1913)
 Francis D. Winston (1913–1916)
 James O. Carr (1916–19)
 Thomas D. Warren (1919–20)
 E. F. Aydlett (1920–21)
 Irvin B. Tucker (1921–30)
 Walter H. Fisher (1930–34)
 James O. Carr (1934–45)
 Charles F. Rouse (1945–46)
 John H. Manning (1946–51)
 Charles P. Green (1951–53)
 Julian T. Gaskill (1953–61)
 Robert H. Cowen (1961–69)
 Warren H. Coolidge (1969–73)
 Thomas P. McNamara (1973–76)
 Carl L. Tilghman (1976–77)
 George M. Anderson (1977–1980)
 James L. Blackburn (1980–81)
 Sam Currin (1981–1987)
 J. Douglas McCullough (acting 1987-88)
 Margaret Currin (1988–1993; wife of Sam Currin)
 J. Douglas McCullough (acting 1993)
 Janice McKenzie Cole (1994–2001)
 Frank Whitney (2002–2005)
 George Holding (2005–2011)
 Thomas Walker (2011–2016)
 John Stuart Bruce (acting 2016)
 Robert Higdon Jr. (2017–2021)
 Michael F. Easley Jr. (2021–present)

See also 
 Courts of North Carolina
 List of current United States district judges
 List of United States federal courthouses in North Carolina

References

External links 
 Official website
 News & Observer: Past political patrons for U.S. Attorneys

North Carolina, Eastern District
North Carolina law
Pasquotank County, North Carolina
Fayetteville, North Carolina
Greenville, North Carolina
Craven County, North Carolina
Wilmington, North Carolina
Organizations based in Raleigh, North Carolina
New Bern, North Carolina
1872 establishments in North Carolina
Courthouses in North Carolina
Courts and tribunals established in 1872